Miguel Villanueva y Gómez (31 October 1852, in Madrid, Spain – 13 September 1931, in  Madrid) was a Spanish politician and lawyer who served as Minister of State from 1915 to 1916, during the reign of King Alfonso XIII of Spain.

Sources
Personal dossier of D. Miguel Villanueva. Spanish Senate

Economy and finance ministers of Spain
Foreign ministers of Spain
1852 births
1931 deaths
Liberal Party (Spain, 1880) politicians
Presidents of the Congress of Deputies (Spain)
Members of the Congress of Deputies of the Second Spanish Republic